Guilherme Santos da Silva (born 13 May 2001) is a Brazilian professional footballer who plays as a winger for Avaí, on loan from Atlético Mineiro.

Football career
Santos passed by the youth academy of Grêmio Laranjeiras, Rio Branco, and Porto Vitória before signing with Atlético Mineiro in 2017. In 2020, he signed on loan with Coimbra. Santos made his professional debut with Coimbra in a 2-1 Campeonato Mineiro loss to Tombense on 27 July 2020, scoring his side's only goal in his debut. On 11 November 2020, Santos signed a professional contract with Atlético Mineiro until 2023.

References

External links

2001 births
Living people
Sportspeople from Espírito Santo
Brazilian footballers
Association football wingers
Clube Atlético Mineiro players
Coimbra Esporte Clube players
Esporte Clube Vitória players
Red Bull Brasil players
Red Bull Bragantino players
Avaí FC players
Campeonato Brasileiro Série A players
Campeonato Brasileiro Série B players